Kanhirode is a census town in Kannur district of Kerala state, India. Kanhirode is located 13 km east of Kannur city on Kannur-Mattanur road.

Demographics
As of 2011 Census, Kanhirode had a population of 15,353 which constitute 7,099 males and 8,254 females. The average sex ratio was 1163 higher than the state average of 1084. In Kanhirode, 11.6% of the population was under 6 years of age. Kanhirode had an average literacy of 95.9% higher than the state average of 94%; male literacy was 98.2% and female literacy was 94%.

Religion
As of 2011 India census, Kanhirode town had a population of 15,353 among which 8,917 (58%) are Hindus, 6318 (41.15%) are Muslims and 0.85% others.

Administration
Kanhirode census town is a part of Munderi Grama Panchayat in Edakkad Block Panchayat. Kanhirode is politically part of Kannur Assembly constituency under Kannur Loksabha.

References

Cities and towns in Kannur district
Suburbs of Kannur